Emmanuel Adu, better known by his stage name Manu Crooks, is a Ghanaian-Australian artist based in Sydney

Biography 
Emmanuel Adu grew up in Ghana and moved to Australia when he was 12 years old where he attended Parramatta High School. He found his love for music at an early age and began producing as a teenager. Manu has performed at many events and festivals including: Rolling Loud Festival, Splendour in the Grass, Falls Festival and Spilt Milk.

In July 2022, Manu Crooks formed the group BBGB with BLESSED, B Wise, Kwame and Lil Spacely. BBGB released their debut single "Tough Love" on 15 July 2022.

Discography

EPs

References

External links
 https://www.facebook.com/officialmanucrooks
 https://soundcloud.com/officialmanucrooks

Australian male rappers
Australian musicians
Living people
1993 births
Musicians from Sydney
Australian record producers
Rappers from Sydney
Ghanaian emigrants to Australia